Michael Ryan Flatley (born July 16, 1958) is an Irish-American dancer. He became known for creating and performing in Irish dance shows Riverdance, Lord of the Dance, Feet of Flames, Celtic Tiger Live and Michael Flatley's Christmas Dance Spectacular. Flatley's shows have played to more than 60 million people in 60 countries and have grossed more than $1 billion. His career also includes work as an actor, writer, director, producer, and philanthropist.

Flatley is credited with reinventing traditional Irish dance by incorporating new rhythms, syncopation, and upper body movements, which were previously absent from the dance, as well as including influences from tap and contemporary dance. He formerly held the Guinness World Records for tap dancing 35 times per second and his feet were at one time insured for $57.6 million. Flatley retired from dance in 2016 due to constant spinal, knee, foot, and rib pain.

Early life
Michael Ryan Flatley was born on July 16, 1958, the second of five children born to Irish parents Michael James Flatley and Elisabeth "Eilish" Flatley (née Ryan), both of whom had emigrated to the United States in 1947. Michael was a plumber from County Sligo, and Eilish was a gifted step dancer from County Carlow whose mother, Hannah Ryan, was a champion dancer. Michael and Eilish met at an Irish dance in Detroit, and were married in that city on August 25, 1956. They eventually had five children: Anne-Marie, Michael, Eliza, Thomasina, and Patrick. When Michael was two months old, the family moved from Detroit to Chicago's South Side. 

In Chicago, Flatley began dance lessons at age eleven with Dennis G. Dennehy at the Dennehy School of Irish Dance. He attended Brother Rice High School, an all-boys Catholic private school. In 1975, at age 17, Flatley was the first American to win a World Irish Dance title at Oireachtas Rince na Cruinne, the Irish dancing championships. In 1975 and 1976, Flatley won twice in the All-Ireland Fleadh Cheoil concert flute competitions.

In the 1970s, Flatley competed in the amateur boxing Chicago Golden Gloves tournament in the 126 pound novice division and won the middleweight division of the Chicago Golden Gloves Boxing Championship. He recorded five knock-out victories. Flatley stated that he continued to flirt with the idea of becoming a professional into the early 1980s, but ultimately stayed with a career in dance. In this early stage of his career he was described as "the white Michael Jackson" by The Hollywood Reporter, the "Rudolph Nureyev of Irish dance" by the Los Angeles Herald-Examiner, and the Washington Post compared his feet to "the hands of Vladimir Horowitz in power and agility". He later became a philanthropic donor to the Golden Gloves organization.

Career

Early career
After graduating high school, Flatley worked in various fields. From 1978 to 1979, Flatley toured with Green Fields of America. In the 1980s, he toured with The Chieftains, though he was turned down when he requested to become a full-time member of the band.

Riverdance
After attracting the attention of Ireland's president, Mary Robinson, and dance-show producers, Flatley was invited to help create an intermission show for the 1994 Eurovision Song Contest. He performed a 7-minute show titled "Riverdance" for the interval act of the contest, which was held in Ireland. After receiving worldwide acclaim, Flatley pushed to turn the show into a full-length production, which became Riverdance. The show was produced by Moya Doherty, with principal choreography by Flatley and lead performances by Flatley and Jean Butler. His creation debuted in February of 1995 at the Point Theatre in Dublin.

In September 1995, after the show sold out, Flatley left Riverdance to pursue what would eventually become Lord of the Dance. Flatley had been in a dispute with the Riverdance producers over his salary and royalty fees. He was fired the night before the show was set to begin its second run in London and replaced with Colin Dunne. He also reportedly did not work well with Butler, though on the split, Flatley said, "I just wanted control over the work that I had created myself. That's all. I don't think that that's too much to ask. I felt like I built it and they took it, and that's the end of it... and it hurt."

Lord of the Dance and Feet of Flames
Immediately after the Riverdance split, Flatley decided to create his own show, Lord of the Dance, which was capable of playing in arenas and stadiums aside from traditional theaters. It premiered in June 1996 at the Point Theatre (now 3Arena) in Dublin then made its U.K. premiere at the London Coliseum. The music for the show was composed by Ronan Hardiman. In 1997, Flatley earned £36 million, ranking him 25th among the world's highest earning entertainers.

In 1998, Flatley created an expanded version of the show called Feet of Flames which served as its one-off performance and his final performance in Lord of the Dance. It was performed outdoors in the Rotten Row/Route of Kings  area of Hyde Park, London on a gigantic 4-tier hydraulic stage, with a live band, and over 100 dancers performing on all four levels of the stage during the finale. Ronan Hardiman's music from the original Lord of the Dance was used again along with new compositions, also by Hardiman himself. The show featured six new numbers; one of which is Flatley's solo.

Following the success of the 1998 Hyde Park show, Flatley produced another version of Feet of Flames in 1999, which included half of the original show and half new material. Titled Feet of Flames: The Victory World Tour, the show was performed also on a multi-level stage and toured Europe in 2000 and the U.S. in 2001.

Celtic Tiger
Flatley's next show, Celtic Tiger Live, opened in July 2005. The show explores the history of the Irish people and Irish emigration to the U.S., fusing a wide range of dance styles, including jazz. The show also includes popular elements from his previous shows, such as Flatley's flute solos and the line of dancers in the finale.

Flatley wrote "I will be a dancer until the day I die" in the program book of the show.

On November 15, 2006, prior to the autumn and winter tours of the show, Flatley was admitted to a private London hospital with a viral infection. He was discharged two weeks later and cancelled said tour.

Television performances (2007–2009)

In November 2007, Flatley and a troupe of male dancers performed on Dancing with the Stars in the U.S. In October 2008, he appeared as a guest judge on an episode of the show, filling in for Len Goodman. He performed the solo "Capone" from Celtic Tiger on the show. Flatley was also the host of Superstars of Dance, an NBC series that ran for 5 episodes in early 2009. He also performed on The Late Show with Stephen Colbert, during the 1997 Academy Awards ceremony, and was interviewed on Piers Morgan's Life Stories in 2011.

Return to the stage (2009–2010)
In December 2009, Flatley returned to the stage for a limited run of the "Hyde Park" version of Feet of Flames in Taiwan. The run of shows had to be extended to meet the demand for tickets.

In 2010, he returned to headline the Lord of the Dance show, with performances in arenas in England, Ireland, Germany, Switzerland, and Austria. However, unlike the original show, the stage for the 2010 Return Tour was redesigned; it featured new sets, new costumes, state-of-the-art lighting, pyrotechnics, and projections.

Lord of the Dance 3D, the 3D film of the return tour, debuted in theaters worldwide in 2011. The 3D film was later released on DVD and Blu-ray under the title, Michael Flatley Returns as Lord of the Dance, and shows performances from the O2 Arenas of London, Dublin, and Berlin.

Flute album (2011)
In 2011, Flatley released On A Different Note, a flute album. The 25 tracks include airs and tunes he has played in his shows, other traditional tunes, and new compositions.

A Night to Remember, Dangerous Games
On May 18, 2014, Flatley recorded a one-off 60 minute ITV Music Specials episode titled Michael Flatley: A Night to Remember celebrating his long career. The show aired on June 1, 2014, and was presented by Christine Bleakley.

Also in the same year, Flatley created a revised spin-off of Lord of the Dance, entitled Lord of the Dance: Dangerous Games, which featured a similar storyline with new numbers, as well as new music by Gerard Fahy, who previously served as a bandleader and musical director in Flatley's shows.

Injuries, farewell tour, and retirement
In May 2015, Flatley revealed that much of his vertebral column was irreparably damaged and that he had a damaged left knee, a torn right calf/triceps surae muscle, two ruptured Achilles tendons, a fractured rib, and a recurring broken bone in his foot. That year, a caricature of him was hung in the Sardi's restaurant on Broadway.

In November 2015, Flatley's show Lord of the Dance: Dangerous Games premiered at the Lyric Theatre, a Broadway theatre. Due to his injuries, Flatley was only able to perform in the final two numbers of the performance. After shows in New York, Flatley went on a final tour in the United States. What was then thought to be Flatley's last show was in Las Vegas on St. Patrick's Day 2016.

Trump inauguration
In January 2017, Flatley introduced his troupe for a performance at the inauguration of Donald Trump. 
Flatley called it "a great honour".

Filmmaking
In 2018, Flatley wrote, directed, financed and starred in Blackbird, a spy film set in Barbados, Ireland and the UK. The film co-stars Patrick Bergin and Eric Roberts. Blackbird was scheduled to receive its world premiere in a private showing at the Raindance Film Festival in London, where Flatley was also a member of the Festival Jury. As of November 2018 pre-production work had already begun on Flatley's second film, titled Dreamdance, set in Hollywood at the outbreak of World War II. Blackbird premiered August 2022 in the Light House Cinema in Dublin.

Painting
Starting in the early 2010s, Flatley has used his choreographer dance moves to create artwork with his feet, by dancing upon paint splattered canvas. A series of paintings he created in the mid-2010s was based upon the Great Irish Famine. As of 2015, Flatley was second only to Jack Butler Yeats in terms of the auction price of paintings by Irish painters.

Business career
Around this time he also founded the food and beverage company Castlehyde, named for his residential estate.  His net worth was reportedly €301 million in 2019.

Awards and achievements
In 1988, Flatley received a National Heritage Fellowship, the highest folk-related honor awarded by the National Endowment for the Arts.

In December 2001, Flatley became the first recipient of the Irish Dancing Commission Fellowship award (an honorary degree in Irish dance) and was also made a Fellow of the American Irish Dance Teachers' Association. In 2003 Flatley received a special award from Prince Rainier of Monaco for his charity work,   and in March 2003 Irish America magazine named Flatley Irish American of the Year. In 2004, Flatley received an honorary doctorate degree from University College Dublin, and that same year received the prestigious Ellis Island Medal of Honor in New York. In 2016 he received an honorary degree from the University of Limerick.

In 2007, the Freedom of the City of Cork was conferred on Flatley at a ceremony in Cork's City Hall. In 2008, he was conferred with the Freedom of the Borough of Sligo at a ceremony in Sligo City Hall. Also in 2008, The Variety Club of Ireland presented Flatley with their Entertainer of the Decade Award.

In 2011, he was inducted into Irish America magazine's Irish America Hall of Fame.

On October 24, 2013, Flatley received the Lifetime Achievement Award at The Irish Post Awards on Park Lane. In 2015, a section of 42nd Street and Broadway in New York City was name "Flatley Way" for the artist. The honour corresponded with his opening of his show Lord of the Dance: Dangerous Games at the nearby Lyric Theatre. In July 2021, Michael received the award for Best Actor at the Monaco Streaming Film Festival for his role in Blackbird. He also received the Freedom of the City of London honour from London, UK, which names a number of specific actions those who receive the honor can take that others cannot—such as the ability to "drive a herd of sheep over London Bridge".

Arms

Personal life

Marriages and family
Flatley met Beata Dziaba in London's Royal Albert Hall. The couple married in 1986 in a Danish registry office; they divorced in 1997 after multiple affairs with other women.

In June 2006, Flatley began dating Niamh O'Brien, a longtime dancer from several of his shows. According to Canon Law, his first marriage as a Catholic in a civil wedding was not recognized by the Church, so the 48 year old Flatley and Niamh, 32, were able to have a Roman Catholic ceremony. On October 14, 2006 the couple married at the heritage landmark St. Patrick's Church in Fermoy, County Cork, with a lavish reception hosted in Flatley's historic Castlehyde House, also located in Cork, Ireland.

He and his wife have a son, Michael St. James, born in 2007. They divide their time between a home in Monte Carlo and Castlehyde House in Ireland.

Health
In 2003, Flatley was treated for a malignant melanoma. Flatley later stated, "It was purely by chance that it was noticed [...] I had never even noticed it... it can be a frightening place to be." On January 11, 2023, a spokesperson for Flatley announced that he had undergone surgery after diagnosis of an aggressive form of cancer. The statement read, "Dear friends, we have something personal to share, Michael Flatley has been diagnosed with an aggressive form of cancer. He has undergone surgery and is in the care of an excellent team of doctors. No further comments will be made at this time. We ask only for your prayers and well wishes."

Properties
In 2001, Flatley purchased Castlehyde, the house originally owned by Douglas Hyde, the first president of Ireland, near Fermoy in north-east Cork, then in a derelict condition, for €3 million. Flatley spent €27 million renovating the mansion and another €20 million furnishing it with artwork and antiques. In 2015, Flatley purchased a mansion in Belgravia, just off Eaton Square, for €28 million and listed Castlehyde for sale for €20 million.

In addition to Castlehyde and his London mansion, Flatley owns valuable properties in the Caribbean, New York, Beverly Hills, and Villefranche-sur-Mer. He has invested a significant portion of his wealth in Berkshire Hathaway.

Other
In 2003, courts ruled that Flatley was extorted and defamed by real estate agent Tyna Marie Robertson, who falsely accused Flatley of sexual assault Robertson was ordered to pay $11 million compensation.

In 2006, Flatley released Lord of the Dance: My Story, his autobiography. 

In 2010, Flatley dedicated the Garden of Memory and Music in Culfadda, County Sligo, the village his father left to seek a new life in America. The ceremony included a speech and an impromptu performance of one of his father's favorite tunes.

Fundraising
Flatley has raised over €1 million for his charitable foundation by selling paintings made using his feet. He has hosted annual Christmas fundraisers for vulnerable children at his estate. In 2010, Flatley participated in the fundraising JP McManus Pro-Am in Adare, County Limerick, Ireland. In 2020 he created the "Flatley'sTapForTen challenge" in order to raise money for people found homeless due to the COVID-19 pandemic, benefiting the charities Depaul in Ireland and Centrepoint in the UK.  He is also a supporter of the Irish Fund for Great Britain that provides social support for Irish citizens living in the UK. 
He has also spent time as an advocate for cancer research. In 2021, Flatley was named an Ambassador of Culture for Co Saolfada, a cancer research advocacy program. Flatley himself was diagnosed with malignant melanoma in 2003 and has since recovered. Flatley has also advocated an anti-war sentiment - in 2003 he performed the anti-war piece Warlord before an audience of national leaders meeting in St. Petersburgh. In 2022 he began fundraising for the humanitarian effort during the Russian invasion of Ukraine, providing revenue from his company's dance performances to the cause.

In popular culture
Flatley has been parodied in several US television series, including Friends, where Chandler Bing expresses his fear of Flatley due to the fact his "legs flail about as if independent from his body". He also appeared in a 2005 episode of The Simpsons, entitled "The Father, the Son, and the Holy Guest Star", in which Marge Simpson dreams of a group of Flatley look-alikes welcoming her into Catholic heaven, and in 3rd Rock from the Sun, 90’s sitcom with Jane Curtin and John Lithgow.

See also
 List of dancers

References

External links

 Riverdance website
 Lord of the Dance website
 
 Michael Flatley's Greatest Moments website

1958 births
American choreographers
American male dancers
American people of Irish descent
American tap dancers
Living people
Musicians from Chicago
National Heritage Fellowship winners
Performers of Irish dance